Callianteum miyabeanum, known as  in Japan, is a species of flowering plant in the Ranunculaceae. It is endemic to Mount Apoi in the Hidaka Mountains of Hokkaidō, Japan.

Status on Japanese red list
The plant is in the endangered category on the red list of threatened plants of Japan.

References

 Wildflowers of Hokkaido, Hokkaido University Press, Sapporo, 1993,  C0045 P2678E
 Biodiversity Center of Japan

Ranunculaceae
Endangered plants
Endemic flora of Japan
Plants described in 1928